Metrobudivnykiv, formerly Metrobudivnykiv imeni G. I. Vashchenka is a station on Kharkiv Metro's Oleksiivska Line. The station opened on 6 May 1995.

On 18 May 2016, the station was renamed conformed with the law banning Communist names in Ukraine. Prior to this, from 2000 up to 2016 the station was named after Grigory Ivanovich Vashchenko, member of the Ukrainian branch of the CPSU who lobbied for the construction of the Kharkiv Metro (and who later became the Soviet Minister of Trade from 1983 to 1986).

References

External links
 

Kharkiv Metro stations
Railway stations opened in 1995